Georg Riedel (born 8 January 1934) is a Swedish double bass player and composer. Riedel migrated to Sweden at the age of four and attended school in Stockholm, including the Adolf Fredrik's Music School.

The best known recording featuring Riedel is probably Jan Johansson's Jazz på svenska ("Jazz in Swedish"), a minimalist-jazz compilation of folk songs recorded in 1962–1963, though Riedel has recorded with other leading Swedish musicians including trumpeter Jan Allan and Arne Domnérus. 

Riedel's profile as a composer derives almost exclusively from writing music for Astrid Lindgren movies, including the main theme from the Emil i Lönneberga ("Emil of Maple Hills") movies. He also composed the music for several films by Arne Mattsson in the 1960s as well as for film adaptions of novels by Stig Dagerman.

Riedel also played on Jazz at the Pawnshop in 1977.

Early life
Riedel was born in Karlovy Vary, Czechoslovakia, to a Sudeten German father and a Czech Jewish mother. In 1938, when Riedel was four years old, the family fled to Sweden following the German annexation of the Sudetenland.

Selected film music 
 491 (1964)
 Morianna (1965)
 Nightmare (1965)
 Woman of Darkness (1966)
 Pippi Longstocking (1969) (with Jan Johansson)
 Emil i Lönneberga (1971)
 Nya hyss av Emil i Lönneberga (1972)
 Emil och griseknoen (1973)
 Karlsson on the Roof (1974)
 The Children of Noisy Village (1986)
 More About the Children of Noisy Village (1987)
 Ved vejen (1988)
 Trust Me (2010)

References

External links 

Georg Riedel at the Swedish Film Database

1934 births
Living people
Litteris et Artibus recipients
Swedish jazz musicians
Gemini Records artists
Radiojazzgruppen members
Czechoslovak emigrants to Sweden
Czechoslovak Jews
Czechoslovak refugees
Swedish Jews
Musicians from Karlovy Vary
Musicians from Stockholm
Swedish people of Czech-Jewish descent
Swedish people of German descent